Woodsmoor railway station is on the Buxton Line in  Woodsmoor, a suburb of Stockport, Greater Manchester, England. It was opened by British Rail in 1990.

Facilities
The station has a staffed ticket office on platform 1, which is staffed on a limited basis (weekday a.m peak only, 07:10 - 10:10). At other times tickets can be purchased from an automated ticket machine situated by the ticket office.  There are standard waiting shelters on each side, whilst train running details are provided via CIS displays, automated announcements and timetable poster boards.  Level access is only available to platform 1 (towards Stockport and Manchester).

Service

Through running north of Manchester ceased temporarily as part of a major timetable change in May 2018. Through running was stopped again in December 2022.

Hope Valley Line trains towards/from Chinley or Sheffield do not stop here.

References

External links

Railway stations in the Metropolitan Borough of Stockport
DfT Category E stations
Railway stations opened by British Rail
Railway stations in Great Britain opened in 1990
Northern franchise railway stations